Cumberland Bay Water Aerodrome  is located  west southwest of Cumberland Bay, New Brunswick, Canada. It is located in a small bay of the same name in Grand Lake.

References

Registered aerodromes in New Brunswick
Seaplane bases in New Brunswick
Transport in Queens County, New Brunswick